Soandos was a town of ancient Cappadocia, inhabited during Roman and Byzantine times.

Its site is located near Soğanlı, Asiatic Turkey.

References

Populated places in ancient Cappadocia
Former populated places in Turkey
Roman towns and cities in Turkey
Populated places of the Byzantine Empire
History of Niğde Province